Schinia buta is a moth of the family Noctuidae. It is endemic to southeast California and northwest Nevada.

The wingspan is about 28 mm.

The larvae feed on Brickellia californica.

External links
Images
Butterflies and Moths of North America

Schinia
Moths of North America
Moths described in 1907